Feliciano Monti (19 December 1902 – 16 June 1990) was an Italian association football manager and footballer who played as a forward. He represented the Italy national football team three times, the first being on 4 March 1923, the occasion of a friendly match against Hungary in a 0–0 home draw. He was also part of the Italian squad for the football tournament at the 1924 Summer Olympics, but he did not play.

References

1902 births
1990 deaths
Italian footballers
Italy international footballers
Association football forwards
Calcio Padova players
Torino F.C. players
Calcio Padova managers
Italian football managers